Sometimes I Think About Dying is a 2023 American romantic dramedy film directed by Rachel Lambert, starring and produced by Daisy Ridley. It is based on the 2019 short film directed and co-written by Stefanie Abel Horowitz which, in turn, was based on a play called Killers by Kevin Armento; Katy Wright-Mead serves as a co-writer for both the short and the feature's screenplay.

The film premiered at the 2023 Sundance Film Festival on January 19, 2023.

Synopsis
Fran (Ridley) is a socially awkward office worker who spends most of her time in isolation and daydreams of her own death, when a new colleague pricks the bubble of her own isolation.

Cast
 Daisy Ridley as Fran
 Dave Merheje as Robert
 Parvesh Cheena as Garrett
 Marcia DeBonis as Carol
 Meg Stalter  as Isobel
 Brittany O'Grady as Sophie
 Bree Elrod as Amelia
 Lauren Beveridge as Tellulah
 Ayanna Berkshire as Emma
 Sean Tarjyoto as Sean
 Jeb Berrier as Doug
 Rich Hinz as Rich
 June Eisler as June

Production
In October 2021, reports surfaced that Daisy Ridley secretly shot an independent drama in Astoria, Oregon; the project would later be announced in December 2021 in which Ridley also produced the film with Rachel Lambert directing. The screenplay by Kevin Armento is a partial adaptation of his own 2013 play Killers, with Stefanie Abel Horowitz, who directed a 2019 short of the same name, also a screenwriter along with Katy Wright-Mead. All three had also been credited with screenwriting the 2019 short and Horowitz had also directed the 2013 play. The film is set in a small city on the coast of Oregon. Ridley told a crowd at Sundance that she related to Fran saying “Like, sometimes I feel like a piece of fucking shit. And sometimes I feel, like, great…What was interesting with Fran was sometimes she’s sort of obnoxious. Sometimes, she’s like, ‘I don’t want to play your games. I don’t want to talk about food. I’m good, I’m apart from this.’ And other times, she’s like, ‘How do I become part of this?’ So I resonated with that.

Release
The film was shown on January 19, 2023 at the Sundance Film Festival.

Reception
On review aggregator website Rotten Tomatoes, the film holds an approval rating of 76% based on 63 reviews, with an average rating of 6.4/10. The critics' consensus reads: "Departing from corporate comedy, Sometimes I Think About Dying modestly explores critical human connection through a superbly, melancholic Daisy Ridley." Metacritic, which uses a weighted average, assigned the film a score of 66 out of 100, based on 13 critics, indicating "generally favorable reviews".

Peter Debruge in Variety said, "Movies tend to cut these bits out, to focus on the escapist stuff, but every once in a while one comes along, searching for poetry in the mundane." Ridley’s character Fran’s daydreams are shown as images, and Debruge noted that those "scenes are unexpected, surreal, accompanied by a lovely, meditative string score from composer Dabney Morris. Fran doesn’t seem suicidal, but she isn’t particularly engaged in life either. The character’s personality is so understated, it’s strange to find someone of Ridley’s stature drawn to such a self-effacing role." Lovia Gyarkye said in The Hollywood Reporter, "Loneliness is the subject of a poetic exploration…Fran is too distinctively drawn to be just an avatar, but the impressions of her solitude are aching reminders of how modern life nurtures an unsettling separateness… Sometimes I Think About Dying, then, is a graceful treatise on how challenging — but liberating — it can be to make connections."

References

External links

 

Films set in Oregon
Films shot in Oregon
American romance films
2020s English-language films
2023 independent films
2023 drama films
2023 romance films
American drama films
Films based on short fiction